Vazhakkad  is a village located on the banks of River Chaliyar Kondotty Taluk, Malappuram District, State of Kerala, India. East and some north part of Vazhakkad bordering with River Chaliyar, South Cheekode and Pulikkal Panchayats and West Vazhayur Grama Panchayat. The nearest town is Edavannappara three kilometers away.

Notable residents
K A Rahman, died 11 January 1999, popularly known as Adhrayi or Adhrehyaka, Founder leader of the Chaliyar Agitation, president of Vazhakkad Grama Panchayat, and winner of Bhoomi Mithra Award. He was the rallying point of the Chaliyar agitators from the beginning. This movement is a success story of a people's environmental movement in the state – perhaps the only one – for the fight against river pollution in this land of rivers continues in other parts of the state.
E. T. Mohammed Basheer, member of the 15th Lok Sabha of India. He represents Ponnani constituency of Kerala and was the Education Minister in the UDF Government, headed by Oommen Chandy. He was also State Education Minister during 1991–1996. He was elected to Kerala Assembly in 1985 (by-election ), 1991, 1996 and 2001 but was defeated in 2006 Kerala Assembly General Election.  Entered politics through M.S.F. later actively engaged in Trade Union field and became State Secretary of S.T.U., worked as President of various trade unions affiliated to STU.

Demographics
Vazhakkad Panjayath has 18 wards:
Vazhakkad
Noonjikkara (a beautiful hamlet)
Edavannappara
Elamaram
Cheenibazar
Mapram
Ananthayoor
Cheruvayoor
Cheruvattoor
Mundumuzhi
Vettathoor
Valillapuzha
Akkode
Choorappatta
Chaliyapram
Oorkadav
Vattappara
Kannathumpara

 India census, Vazhakkad had a population of 35774 with 17280 males and 18494 females.

See also

 Elamaram
 Edavannappara

References

External links

Legend of the Chaliyar
Web Page 
School 

   Villages in Malappuram district
Kondotty area